Bobby Miller DeWeese (November 8, 1934 – November 25, 2020) was an American politician and physician who served as a Republican member of the Kentucky House of Representatives from 1993 to 2016, representing the 48th district.

He was the Republican Minority Caucus Chair. DeWeese attended the University of Kentucky for a Bachelor of Science degree, and the University of Louisville for his M.D. He was a general surgeon and both a member and president of the Jefferson County Medical Society, in addition to the Kentucky and American Medical Association. He received the Dr. Nathan Davis Award from the American Medical Association. He is married to Angela for 62 years and had four children.

Committees he served on:
Appropriations and Revenue Committee
House Budget Review Subcommittee on Human Resources
House Economic Development Committee
House Health and Welfare Committee
House Rules Committee
Legislative Research Commission Committee
Medicaid Oversight and Advisory Committee

DeWeese died on November 25, 2020, at the age of 86.

References

1934 births
2020 deaths
Republican Party members of the Kentucky House of Representatives
People from Ballard County, Kentucky
Politicians from Louisville, Kentucky
University of Kentucky alumni
University of Louisville School of Medicine alumni
Physicians from Kentucky
21st-century American politicians